The Cologne Centurions are an American football team based in Cologne, Germany, that plays in the European League of Football (ELF).

History 
In March 2021, it was announced that a new franchise in Cologne is one of the eight teams to play in the inaugural season of the European League of Football. The team would be named Cologne Centurions, taking the identity of the former NFL Europe team, after the league reached an agreement with the NFL for the naming rights. After finishing 5–5 in the regular season, Cologne advanced to the play-offs where they were eliminated by eventual champion Frankfurt Galaxy (ELF) in the first round. After the season, their Head Coach Kirk Heidelberg left the organization, reportedly in mutual agreement.

Stadium 
The Centurions are playing their home games at Südstadion in Cologne.

Roster

Staff

See also
:Category:Cologne Centurions (ELF) seasons

References

External links 
 Official website

European League of Football teams
American football teams in Germany
Sport in Cologne
2021 establishments in Germany
American football teams established in 2021